Michael Foylan (29 June 1907 – 28 May 1976) was a Scottish clergyman who served as the Roman Catholic Bishop of Aberdeen from 1964 to 1976.

Born in Shettleston, Glasgow, Lanarkshire in June 1907, he was ordained a priest on 5 July 1931 for the Diocese of Dunkeld. He was curate of St Andrew's Cathedral, Dundee 1931-1937 and St Joseph's, Dundee 1937-1946. He was appointed parish priest of St Serf's, High Valleyfield in 1946 and returned to St Andrew's Cathedral as parish priest in 1949.

He was appointed the Bishop of the Diocese of Aberdeen by the Holy See on 8 December 1964, and consecrated to the Episcopate on 25 March 1965. The principal consecrator was Archbishop Gordon Joseph Gray, and the principal co-consecrators were Bishop Joseph Michael McGee and Bishop William Andrew Hart. He attended the fourth session of the Second Vatican Council in 1965.

He died in office on 28 May 1976 at the age of 68.

References 

1907 births
1976 deaths
Bishops of Aberdeen
20th-century Roman Catholic bishops in Scotland
Scottish Roman Catholic bishops